Clans in the Sicilian Mafia are united under a Mandamento, led by a Capo madamento, that represents the clans' bosses to the Cupola. In Sicily, there are 94 Mafia families subject to 29 mandamenti.

Province of Agrigento
Cuntrera-Caruana Mafia clan

(10 mandamenti):
Ribera
Santa Elisabetta
Agrigento
Porto Empedocle
Canicattì
Cianciana
Sambuca di Sicilia
Casteltermini
Palma di Montechiaro
Campobello di Licata

Province of Caltanissetta
Rinzivillo Mafia clan

(4 mandamenti):
Gela
Vallelunga
Riesi
Mussomeli

Province of Catania

(none mandamenti)

Catania
Ramacca
Caltagirone

Palermo
Graviano Mafia clan
Motisi Mafia clan
Greco Mafia clan

(8 mandamenti):
Porta Nuova
Brancaccio
Boccadifalco
Passo di Rigano
Santa Maria di Gesù
Noce
Pagliarelli
Resuttana
San Lorenzo

Province of Palermo
Corleonesi Mafia clan
Inzerillo Mafia clan

(7 mandamenti):
Camporeale
Corleone
Cinisi
Bagheria
Trabia
Belmonte Mezzagno
delle Madonie

Province of Trapani
(4 mandamenti):

Mazara del Vallo
Trapani
Alcamo
Castelvetrano

Other
Mistretta
Capo D'Orlando
Sud Siracusa

References

Organized crime-related lists